Amand (also Romanized as ‘Amand; also known as Āmad) is a village in Khandan Rural District, Tarom Sofla District, Qazvin County, Qazvin Province, Iran. At the 2006 census, its population was 19, in 10 families.

Western analysts believe Amand has been a manufacturing site for nuclear weapons; the government agreed to allow inspectors from the International Atomic Energy Agency in August 2020.

References 

Populated places in Qazvin County